Olaf Petersen may refer to:

 Olaf Petersen, a character from Red Dwarf
 Olaf Petersen (photographer) (1915–1994), New Zealand photographer
 Olaf Wilhelm Petersen (1841–1909), Norwegian military officer and sports official